Gowerton Rugby Football Club is a Welsh rugby union club based in Gowerton near Swansea, Wales; officially founded in 1884. Gowerton RFC is a member of the Welsh Rugby Union and is a feeder club for the Ospreys.

Gowerton RFC presently run a Senior XV, Seconds XV, youth XV and Junior teams from under 7's to under 16's.

Notable past players
''See also :Category:Gowerton RFC players

  David John Thomas (10 caps)
  Stephen Thomas (3 caps)
  Billy Williams

References

Rugby union in Swansea
Rugby clubs established in 1884
Welsh rugby union teams